'Lewis Summers Farm is a historic home and farm located at Ottsville, Tinicum Township, Bucks County, Pennsylvania. The farmhouse was built about 1830, and is a vernacular German Colonial stone dwelling.  A stone addition was built in 1866.  The main section is 2 1/2-stories, four bays wide, and measures 32 feet by 28 feet.  The front facade features a hipped roof portico. Also on the property are a variety of contributing farm-related outbuildings and structures.

It was added to the National Register of Historic Places in 1991. It is professionally managed by Robert Dandi of REMAX Central.

References

Farms on the National Register of Historic Places in Pennsylvania
Houses completed in 1866
Houses in Bucks County, Pennsylvania
1866 establishments in Pennsylvania
National Register of Historic Places in Bucks County, Pennsylvania